Alfredo Montenegro Martino (born 22 July 1955) is a Peruvian rower. He competed in the men's coxed pair event at the 1984 Summer Olympics.

Notes

References

External links
 
 

1955 births
Living people
Peruvian male rowers
Olympic rowers of Peru
Rowers at the 1984 Summer Olympics
Place of birth missing (living people)
Rowers at the 1983 Pan American Games
Pan American Games medalists in rowing
Pan American Games bronze medalists for Peru